Wait and See is a 1928 British silent comedy film directed by Walter Forde and starring Frank Stanmore, Pauline Johnson and Sam Livesey.

Cast

 Walter Forde as Monty Merton 
 Frank Stanmore as Frankie 
 Pauline Johnson as Jocelyn Winton 
 Sam Livesey as Gregory Winton 
 Mary Brough as Landlady 
 Charles Dormer as Eustace Mottletoe 
 Ian Wilson as Caddie
 Constance Wootten as various roles

References

External links

1928 films
British comedy films
Films directed by Walter Forde
Films set in England
Films shot at Nettlefold Studios
British black-and-white films
1928 comedy films
British silent feature films
Butcher's Film Service films
1920s English-language films
1920s British films
Silent comedy films
English-language comedy films